The inauguration of Iván Duque as 33rd President of Colombia marked the commencement of Iván Duque's term as president and Marta Lucía Ramírez as 18th vice president.

The event was the 46th presidential inauguration. Held in Bogotá, D.C., from 7 August 2018 inaugural events included concerts and a swearing-in ceremony.

Schedule
The inauguration began at 2:00 and as is customary, the elected president left the palace of San Carlos, along with his wife and children, being escorted by ten pipers from the Colombian National Navy, who were in charge of escorting them to the Plaza de Bolívar where more of 600 guests including representatives of public power, former presidents and international delegations, later Duque was sworn in as the 33rd President of Colombia, being the youngest in the 200-year history, and as a following act the presidential sash was imposed on him, the afternoon was marred by bad weather conditions that threatened a major storm, and that during part of the ceremony threatened strong winds, one of these being the cause of the destruction of two of the six flags of more than 5 meters that covered the columns of the National Capitol.
                                                                             
After the imposition of the band, Duque Prodigy with the oath of Marta Lucía Ramírez as the 18th Vice President of Colombia, being the first time that a woman holds this position in 200 years of history.

Parade to the House of Nariño

After his speech, Duque and his family prepared to take the road to the Nariño house where former President Juan Manuel Santos, his wife María Clemecia and their youngest son Martín were waiting for the new presidential family, upon arrival Duque received his first greeting from the armed forces as the new Head of State, and immediately afterwards the two families proceeded to greet each other, to give rise to the next act where Juan Manuel Santos, after eight years as President of Colombia, together with his family, descendants of the central staircase of the house of nariño to take the traditional last walk through the house of nariño as head of state.

Inaugural address
During his inauguration speech, he stated that he comes with the idea of uniting Colombians, after the polarization in which he has been immersed in recent years.

As president of Colombians, he mentioned, during the first part of his speech, the bicentennial of Colombia's independence, which will be celebrated next year, with which he invited Colombians to "leave their egos to forge a purpose common"

He also pointed out that Colombians "when we unite as a people, nothing stops us. When we all contribute, we are capable of realizing our own feats that not even magical realism is capable of imagining, which is why he stressed that the history of Colombia makes it clear that we are a brave, hard-working nation that does not give up at the first sound.

Presence of world leaders
The inauguration was attended by 10 heads of state and 17 delegations

 – President Mauricio Macri
 – President Evo Morales
 – President Sebastián Piñera
 – Vice President Epsy Campbell
 – President Danilo Medina
 – President Lenín Moreno
 – former Prime Minister of Spain Felipe González
 – President Jimmy Morales
 – President Juan Orlando Hernández
 – President Juan Carlos Varela
 – Vice President Alicia Pucheta
 – President Enrique Peña Nieto
 – United States Ambassador to the United Nations Nikki Haley

Presence of former presidents and first ladies
Álvaro Uribe, 31th President
Lina María Moreno, former First lady
Andrés Pastrana, 30th President
Nohra Puyana Bickenbach, former First lady
Ernesto Samper, 29th President
Jacquin Strouss, former First lady
César Gaviria, 28th President
Ana Milena Muñoz, former First lady

See also
 2018 Colombian presidential election
 Iván Duque
 Marta Lucía Ramírez
 Inauguration of Gustavo Petro

References

Duque, Iván
Presidency of Iván Duque
2018 in Colombia
2018 in politics
August 2018 events in South America